The PD 500 (Panzersprengbombe Dickwandig) or thick walled armor-piercing explosive bomb in English was an armor-piercing bomb used by the Luftwaffe during World War II.

Design 
The PD series of bombs differed for the SC series because they had thick cases for enhanced penetration of armored targets like warships.  The charge-to-weight ratio of the bomb was low at only 6.3%, while most general-purpose bombs had a charge-to-weight ratio of between 30 and 50%.  The body was of two-piece drawn-steel construction which was filled through the base with RDX and was fitted with a magnesium alloy 4 finned tail with a cylindrical strut.  A single electric fuze was located in the base, and an electrical charging head was located in the rear 1/3 of the body.  The PD 500 was horizontally suspended by an H-Type suspension lug in a bomb bay or fuselage hardpoint.  It was dropped in horizontal flight from a height of at least , and penetration was stated to be .  The bombs were painted sky blue with red stripes on the tail.

See also 

 List of weapons of military aircraft of Germany during World War II

References

External links

World War II aerial bombs of Germany